HFM may refer to:

 Hachette Filipacchi Médias, a magazine publisher
 Harborough FM, a radio station covering Market Harborough and South Leicestershire in the United Kingdom
 Harvest Fund Management, a Chinese asset management company
 Hemifacial microsomia
 Hand, Foot and Mouth disease, a human disease
 Henry Ford Museum, in Dearborn, Michigan, United States
 Hereditary folate malabsorption
 Hi Fly Malta, a Maltese airline
 Hiroshima FM, a radio station in the Hiroshima area
 His or Her Most Faithful Majesty
 Hollow fiber membrane
 The Hunger for More, a 2004 album by rapper Lloyd Banks